Guard Battalion may refer to:

Presidential Guard Battalion (Brazil)
Guard Battalion (Estonia)
Wachbataillon
Guard Battalion (Moldova)
Ceremonial Guard Battalion
21st Ceremonial Guard Battalion

See also
Brigade of Guards